Wyham cum Cadeby (otherwise Wyham with Caldeby) is a depopulated civil parish in the East Lindsey district of Lincolnshire, England.

Wyham cum Cadeby consists of the remaining hamlet of Wyham and the former village of Cadeby, otherwise North Cadeby, both settlements a deserted medieval village.

The parish church, dedicated to All Saints, once seated 90.  It was restored in 1886 and declared redundant and sold in 1982.  The parish records are held in Lincoln.

There is a former chalk quarry which has been converted to a clay and skeet shooting ground.

References

External links

History of Cadeby Hall, pictures and maps

Villages in Lincolnshire
Archaeological sites in Lincolnshire
Civil parishes in Lincolnshire
East Lindsey District